The Heavenly Sword and Dragon Saber is a Hong Kong television series adapted from Louis Cha's novel of the same title. The series was released overseas in 2000 before broadcasting on TVB Jade in Hong Kong in 2001. It has the record for most TVB Best Actress winners, including Charmaine Sheh (2006/2014), Gigi Lai (2004), Michelle Yim (2008), Tavia Yeung (2012), and Kara Wai (2018).

Cast
 Note: Some of the characters' names are in Cantonese romanisation.

 Lawrence Ng as Cheung Mo-kei
 John Tang as young Cheung Mo-kei
 Gigi Lai as Chiu Man
 Charmaine Sheh as Chow Chi-yeuk
 Damian Lau as Cheung Tsui-san
 Michelle Yim as Yan So-so
 Felix Lok as Tse Sun
 Chow Chung as Cheung Sam-fung
 Joyce Tang as Yeung Bat-fui / Gei Hiu-fu
 Gordon Liu as Seng Kwan
 Liz Kong as Siu-chiu
 Cherie Chan as Yan Lei
 Eddie Cheung as Yeung Siu
 Wong Wai-tak as Fan Yiu
 Ku Feng as Yan Tin-cheng
 Wilson Tsui as Yan Ye-wong
 Alice Fung as Golden Flower Granny
 Kara Hui as Mit-juet
 Lee Lung-kei as Sung Yun-kiu
 Raymond Cho as Sung Cheng-xu
 Leung Kin-ping as Yu Lin-chow
 Lee Kwok-lun as Yu Doi-ngam
 Lee Kong-lung as Cheung Chung-kai
 Edward Mok as Yan Lei-ting
 Ken Lok as Mok Seng-kuk
 Wong Ching as Wai Yat-siu
 Wong Chun-tong as Chow Din
 Johnson Law as Sack Monk
 Doi Siu-man as Lang Hin
 Tse Ka-hei as Pang Ying-yuk
 Lo Mang as Seung Yu-chun
 Anderson Junior as Wu Ching-ngau
 Yau Man-sing as Chu Yun-cheung
 Kwan Ching as Luk Cheung-hak
 Tse Bo-law as Ha Bat-yung
 Akina Hong as Ding Man-kwan
 Steve Lee as Ho Tai-chung
 Sherming Yiu as Chu Kau-chan
 Lau Dan as Yu-yeung Prince
 Gabriel Harrison as Wong Bo-bo
 Zuki Lee as Kwok Seung
 June Chan as Yellow Dress Maiden
 Sammul Chan as Hon Cin-jip, Siu-chiu's father
 Elvina Kong as Doi Ji-si, Siu-chiu's mother 
 Tavia Yeung as Ngo-mei student

Soundtrack

Track list
 Fung Hei Wan Yung (風起雲湧; Storm Rises) performed by Lawrence Ng
 Wan Hing I (溫馨; Gentle and Fragrant I)
 Chong Leung (蒼涼; Bleak)
 Hing Sung (輕鬆; Relaxed)
 Fau Sang Yeuk Mung (浮生若夢; Transient Life is Like a Dream) performed by Liz Kong
 Ching Mai (情迷; Infatuated Love)
 Ngoi Ching I (愛情; Love I)
 Ngoi Ching II (愛情; Love II)
 Hung Hung Sing Fo (熊熊聖火; Brilliant Holy Flame)
 Gung Sing (功成; Success)
 Wan Hing II (溫馨; Gentle and Fragrant II)
 Ngoi Ching III (愛情; Love III)
 Gam Seung (感傷; Sorrowful)
 Gan Jeung (緊張; Nervous)
 Yuen Yi (懸疑; Suspense)
 Lin Gung (練功; Training)
 Sau (愁; Anxiety)
 Ngoi (哀; Sadness)

Bonus track
 Ha Chi Joi Lyun Ngoi (下次再戀愛; Love Next Time) performed by Lawrence Ng

References

External links

2000 Hong Kong television series debuts
2000 Hong Kong television series endings
TVB dramas
Hong Kong wuxia television series
Television shows based on The Heaven Sword and Dragon Saber
Television series set in the Yuan dynasty
Sequel television series
Television series about orphans
Television shows about rebels
Television shows set on islands